Jungjong of Joseon (16 April 1488 – 29 November 1544), personal name Yi Yeok (Korean: 이역; Hanja: 李懌), firstly titled Grand Prince Jinseong (Korean: 진성대군; Hanja: 晉城大君), was the 11th ruler of the Joseon dynasty of Korea. He succeeded to the throne after the deposition of his older half-brother, the tyrannical Yeonsangun.

Biography

Rise to power 

In September 1506, on the day Yeonsangun was deposed, soldiers belonging to the coup's leaders surrounded the house of Grand Prince Jinseong. He was about to commit suicide, thinking that his older half-brother was finally going to kill him, but after being dissuaded by his wife, Lady Shin (later known as Queen Dangyeong), Grand Prince Jinseong found himself becoming the eleventh king of Joseon.

Jo Gwang-jo's reforms 
Jungjong worked hard to wipe out the remnants of Yeonsangun's era by reopening Sungkyunkwan (the royal university) and the Office of Censors (which criticizes inappropriate actions of the king). However, during the early days of his reign, the new king could not exert the royal power freely as those who put him on the throne held immense control over the country. When three of the main leaders of coup died of old age or natural causes in the next eight years, Jungjong began to assert his authority and carried out large-scale reforms with the help of Jo Gwang-jo and other Sarim scholars, despite much opposition from conservative nobles who had participated in the 1506 rebellion.

Jo Gwang-jo strengthened local autonomy by establishing a self-governing system called Hyangyak, promoted Confucian writings by translating them into hangul (Korean native script) and distributing them widely, pursued a land reform that would distribute land more equally between the rich and poor, and introduced a supplementary system to recruit talents for the government. He believed that any talented people, including slaves, should be appointed as officials regardless of social status. The Annals of the Joseon dynasty state that during his time as Inspector General (Daesaheon; 대사헌), he enforced the laws strictly so that no official dared to receive a bribe or exploit the local populace.

While Jungjong and Jo Gwang-jo shared a common passion for the reformist agenda, the former was chiefly interested in solidifying royal authority whereas the latter was more concerned with neo-Confucian ideology, according to which those who rule must be a virtuous example to the rest. Jo's uncompromising character and frequent remonstrations also began to irritate the king.

In late 1519, the conservative officials came up with a plan to further weaken Jo Gwang-jo's influence; they used honey to write Ju Cho Wi Wang ("Ju Cho will be King"; 주초위왕, 走肖爲王) on mulberry leaves so that caterpillars would leave behind the same words as if in supernatural manifestation. When the hanja characters 走 (ju) and 肖 (cho) are put together, they form the character 趙 (jo), and the expression's meaning changes to "Jo [Gwang-jo] will be King". The incident was reminiscent of another occurrence that took place before the fall of the Goryeo dynasty, when the phrase Mok Ja Deuk Guk ("Son of wood will gain the country"; 목자득국, 木子得國) became popular. In this case, the combined characters 木 ("wood") and 子 ("son") form the character  李 ("yi"), which was the surname of General Yi Seong-gye (later known as King Taejo, the founder of Joseon).

The only living leader of the 1506 coup, Hong Gyeong-ju (홍경주, 洪景舟), used this event to heighten Jungjong's suspicions and fears. Finally, in January 1520, Jo Gwang-jo was executed on charges of factionalism and many of his followers were exiled, while his radical reform programs were abruptly abandoned. The incident became known as the Third Literati Purge (Gimyo Sahwa; 기묘사화, 己卯士禍).

Rule of in-laws 
After Jo Gwang-jo's elimination, Jungjong never had the chance to rule on his own again. His reign was marked by tumultuous struggle among various conservative factions, each of them backed by one of the king's wives or concubines.

In 1524, Nam Gon and Shim Jung ousted the corrupt official Gim Ahn-ro (김안로, 金安老), but he managed to return to power and took revenge by accusing Royal Noble Consort Gyeong (one of the king's concubines) of plotting against the crown prince, which led to her execution along with her only son, Prince Bokseong. Following this case, Gim Ahn-ro started using the protection of the crown prince as an excuse to begin a reign of terror against his enemies, and even attempted to depose Jungjong's third wife, Queen Munjeong, after she gave birth to a son (the future King Myeongjong). He eventually met his downfall at the hands of the queen's brothers, Yun Won-ro and Yun Won-hyeong. Despite these events, Yun Im, older brother of the late Queen Janggyeong and an ally of Gim Ahn-ro, was able to maintain his standing and preserve his nephew's position as heir to the throne.

The scholars and officials now gathered around two new centers of power and each group developed into separate political factions. Yun Im's party became known as "Greater Yun" and the Yun brothers' party as  "Lesser Yun". Their conflict caused the Fourth Literati Purge (Ulsa Sahwa; 을사사화, 乙巳士禍) after Jungjong's death.

As the royal court was weakened by the continual internal conflict, foreign powers driven away by earlier monarchs returned with much greater effect. Japanese pirates often plundered the southern coastal regions, while the Jurchens attacked the northern frontier numerous times, bleeding the army dry.

Death 
The king died on 29 November 1544 and was originally buried in Goyang, Gyeonggi Province. He was later moved to the Seonjeongneung Cluster, in Seoul, the burial ground of his parents, King Seongjong and Queen Jeonghyeon. The tomb is called Jeongneung (정릉).

The throne passed to his eldest legitimate son, Crown Prince Yi Ho (posthumously honored as King Injong), who died without issue less than a year later and was succeeded by his younger half-brother, Grand Prince Gyeongwon (today known as King Myeongjong).

Family 
Father: King Seongjong of Joseon (20 August 1457 – 20 January 1494)
Grandfather: Deokjong of Joseon (1438 – 2 September 1457)
Grandmother: Queen Sohye of the Cheongju Han clan (7 October 1437 – 11 May 1504)
Mother: Queen Jeonghyeon of the Papyeong Yun clan (21 July 1462 – 13 September 1530)
Grandfather: Yun Ho (1424 – 9 April 1496)
Grandmother: Lady Jeon of the Damyang Jeon clan
Consorts and their respective issue(s):
 Queen Dangyeong of the Geochang Shin clan (7 February 1487 – 27 December 1557) — No issue.
 Queen Janggyeong of the Papyeong Yun clan (10 August 1491 – 16 March 1515)
 Yi Ok-ha, Princess Hyohye (13 June 1511 – 6 May 1531) ( 이옥하), first daughter
 Crown Prince Yi Ho (10 March 1515 – 7 August 1545), fourth son
 Queen Munjeong of the Papyeong Yun clan (2 December 1501 – 5 May 1565)
 Yi Ok-hye, Princess Uihye (1521–1564) ( 이옥혜), seventh daughter
 Yi Ok-rin, Princess Hyosun (1522–1538) ( 이옥린), eight daughter
 Yi Ok-hyeon, Princess Gyeonghyeon (1530–1584) ( 이옥현), eleventh daughter
 Yi Hwan, Grand Prince Gyeongwon (3 July 1534 – 3 August 1567), tenth son
 Princess Insun (1542–1545), twelfth daughter
 Royal Noble Consort Gyeong of the Miryang Park clan (1492–1533)
 Yi Mi, Prince Bokseong (28 September 1509 – 18 June 1533), first son
 Yi Cheol-hwan, Princess Hyesun (12 February 1512 – 1583) ( 이철환), second daughter
 Yi Seok-hwan, Princess Hyejeong (27 October 1514 – 1580) ( 이석환), third daughter
 Royal Noble Consort Hui of the Namyang Hong clan (1494–1581)
 Yi Yeong, Prince Geumwon (1513 – 1562), third son
 Yi Wan, Prince Bongseong (1528 – 1547), seventh son
Eleventh son (? – ?)
Twelfth son (? – ?)
Thirteenth son (? – ?)
 Royal Noble Consort Chang of the Ansan Ahn clan (2 September 1499 – 7 November 1549)
 Yi Geo, Prince Yeongyang (24 April 1521 – 27 July 1561), fifth son
 Yi Seon-hwan, Jeongsin (1526 – 1552) ( 이선환), tenth daughter
Yi Cho, Prince Deokheung (2 April 1530 – 14 June 1559), ninth son
Yi Su (이수)(? – ?), fourtheenth son
 Royal Consort Gwi-in of the Cheongju Han clan (1500 – 1571)
 Eight son (1528 – 1528)
 Royal Consort Suk-ui of the Naju Na clan (1489 – 1514) — No issue.
 Royal Consort Suk-ui of the Gyeongju Yi clan (? – 1524)
 Yi Gi, Prince Deokyang (1524 – 1581), sixth son
 Royal Consort Suk-ui of the Namyang Hong clan
 Yi Hui, Prince Haean (15 June 1511 – 4 August 1573), second son
 Royal Consort Suk-ui of the Kim clan (? – 1562)
 Yi Su-hwan, Princess Sukjeong (1525–1564) ( 이수환), ninth daughter
 Royal Consort Suk-won of the Yi clan (? – 1520)
 Yi Jeong-hwan, Princess Jeongsun (18 December 1517 – 22 September 1581) ( 이정환), fifth daughter
 Yi Sun-hwa, Princess Hyojeong (29 October 1520 – 19 February 1544) ( 이순환), sixth daughter
 Royal Consort Suk-won of the Gwon clan — No issue.
 Unknown
 Fourth Daughter (1516  – ?)

Ancestry

Legacy 
While Jungjong was a good and able administrator especially during the reform period led by Jo Gwang-jo, historians see him as a fundamentally weak king who was too easily swayed by both Jo Gwang-jo and the conservative ministers who placed him on the throne. Sometimes, he is seen as a tragic figure who was forced to become king and to depose his loving wife under the pressure of the coup leaders, who also killed her father. More recently, some historians have suggested that Jungjong was not actually manipulated by his ministers and in-laws, but rather used them to get rid of one another to strengthen royal authority albeit not successfully. In either case, Jungjong's reign was marred by much confusion, violence, corruption, and court intrigues. He has been especially criticized for allowing the Third Literati Purge and executing Jo Gwang-jo on false charges.

In popular culture 
 Portrayed by Lee Gyung-yung in the 1988 film Diary of King Yeonsan.
 Portrayed by Choi Jong-hwan in the 2001–2002 SBS TV series Ladies of the Palace and in the 2017 SBS TV series Saimdang, Memoir of Colors.
 Portrayed by Im Ho in the 2003–2004 MBC TV series Dae Jang Geum.
 Portrayed by Park Chan-hwan in the 2006 KBS2 TV series Hwang Jini.
 Portrayed by Noh Young-hak in the 2007–2008 SBS TV series The King and I.
 Portrayed by Choi Il-hwa in the 2013 KBS2 TV series The Fugitive of Joseon.
 Portrayed by Go Kyung-pyo in the 2015 film The Treacherous.
 Portrayed by Kim Beop-rae in the 2016 MBC TV series The Flower in Prison.
 Portrayed by Baek Seung-hwan and Yeon Woo-jin in the 2017 KBS2 TV series Queen for Seven Days.
 Portrayed by Park Hee-soon in the 2018 film Monstrum.

See also 
Seonjeongneung

References

External links 
 

1488 births
1544 deaths
16th-century Korean monarchs